The 1781 Epsom Derby was the second running of The Derby - the horse race known as the "greatest turf event in the world".  It took place on 24 May 1781 on Epsom Downs in Surrey, England, and was won by Young Eclipse, owned by gambler Dennis O'Kelly and ridden by Charles Hindley.

The previous year, Lord Derby had instigated a race at Epsom Racecourse for three-year-old horses, the name of which had been decided on a coin toss between Derby and Sir Charles Bunbury, a member of the Jockey Club (although it may have been that Bunbury deferred to Derby, who was his host at the time). The race was over 1 mile (although in 1784 that would be increased to 1 mile 4 furlongs, the distance it has been ever since).

The 1780 race had been won by Bunbury's horse Diomed, which was the favourite, beating Boudrow, owned by Dennis O'Kelly. In this second running of the race, it was O'Kelly who had the winner, Young Eclipse, another colt by the pre-eminent sire of the day, Eclipse. He beat Sir John Lade's Crop who was much the more fancied of the runners, going off 5/4 favourite.

Race details
 Winner's prize money: £1,312 10s 
 Going: not known
 Number of runners: 14 or 15
 Winner's time: not known

Full result

Winner details
Further details of the winner, Young Eclipse:

 Foaled: 1778
 Sire: Eclipse
 Dam: Juno by Spectator
 Owner: Dennis O'Kelly
 Breeder: Dennis O'Kelly

Notes

References

Bibliography

Epsom Derby
 1781
18th century in Surrey
1781 in English sport